Process art is an artistic movement where the end product of art and craft, the objet d’art (work of art/found object), is not the principal focus; the process of its making is one of the most relevant aspects if not the most important one: the gathering, sorting, collating, associating, patterning, and moreover the initiation of actions and proceedings. Process artists saw art as pure human expression. Process art defends the idea that the process of creating the work of art can be an art piece itself. Artist Robert Morris predicated “anti-form”, process and time over an objectual finished product.

Movement
Process art has been entitled as a creative movement in the US and Europe in the mid-1960s. It has roots in performance art, the Dada movement and, more traditionally, the drip paintings of Jackson Pollock, and in its employment of serendipity. Change and transience are marked themes in the process art movement. The Guggenheim Museum states that Robert Morris in 1968 had a groundbreaking exhibition and essay defining the movement and the Museum website states:Process Artists were involved in issues attendant to the body, random occurrences, improvisation, and the liberating qualities of nontraditional materials such as wax, felt, and latex. Using these, they created eccentric forms in erratic or irregular arrangements produced by actions such as cutting, hanging, and dropping, or organic processes such as growth, condensation, freezing, or decomposition. 
The process art movement and the environmental art movement are directly related:
Process Artists engage the primacy of organic systems, using perishable, insubstantial, and transitory materials such as dead rabbits, steam, fat, ice, cereal, sawdust, and grass. The materials are often left exposed to natural forces: gravity, time, weather, temperature, etc.

In process art, as in the Arte Povera movement, nature itself is lauded as art; the symbolization and representation of nature, often rejected.

Antecedent

The process art movement has precedent in indigenous rites, shamanic and religious rituals, cultural forms such as sandpainting, sun dance, and the tea ceremony are fundamentally related pursuits. Aspects of the process of the construction of a Vajrayana Buddhist sand mandala (a subset of sandpainting) of Medicine Buddha by monks from Namgyal Monastery in Ithaca, New York that began February 26, 2001 and concluded March 21, 2001 has been captured and web-exhibited by the Ackland's Yager Gallery of Asian Art. The dissolution of the mandala was on June 8, 2001.

Relationship to other disciplines and movements
Process art shares fundamental features with a number of other fields, including the expressive therapies and transformative arts, both of which pivot around how the creative process of engaging in artistic activities can precipitate personal insight, individual healing, and social change, independent of the perceived value attributed to the object of creation.

Additionally, process art is integral to arts-based research, which uses creative process and artistic expression to investigate subjects that resist description or representation through other modes of inquiry.

Artists 
The maximum exponents of process art are Abel Azcona, Lynda Benglis, Joseph Beuys, Chris Drury, Eva Hesse, Gary Kuehn, Barry Le Va, Bruce Nauman, Robert Morris, Richard Serra, Keith Sonnier, Aida Tomescu, and Richard Van Buren.

References

Further reading
 Wheeler, D. (1991). Art Since the Midcentury: 1945 to the Present.

Modern art
Contemporary art movements